Fukuia is a genus of amphibious freshwater snails and land snails with an operculum, gastropod mollusks in the family Pomatiopsidae.

Distribution 
The genus Fukuia is endemic to Honshu, Japan. These snails occur especially in the northern and western part of Japan, on the coast of the Sea of Japan. There is a unique climate in the Sea of Japan with high precipitation due to winter snowfall in the area of distribution of Fukuia. These snails have been described as a "Japan Sea element".

Species
Species within the genus Fukuia include:

 Fukuia integra (Pilsbry, 1924) - synonym: Blanfordia integra Pilsbry, 1924, terrestrial
 Fukuia kurodai Abbott & Hunter, 1949 - type species, amphibious
 Fukuia kurodai kurodai Abbott & Hunter, 1949
 Fukuia kurodai niigataensis Minato, 1973
 Fukuia multistriata Abbott & Hunter, 1949 - amphibious

The speciation of genus Fukuia likely started around 7.2 million years ago in the Late Miocene.

Unassigned to genus:
 Fukuia ooyagii Minato, 1982 - Aquatic species Fukuia ooyagii should be separated from Fukuia, and its generic assignment should be determined coupled with the investigation of its soft-part morphology.

Ecology 
Fukuia kurodai and Fukuia multistriata live amphibiously around rocky walls of steep valleys covered with ferns and bryophytes, and moistened by dripping water. They live only along the mountain streamlets where such habitats are typically found, and often occur with pleurocerid freshwater snails.

Fukuia integra lives as a terrestrial snail in inland forests.

References
This article incorporates CC-BY-2.0 text from the reference

External links 
 

Pomatiopsidae